Shani Cooper-Zubida has been the Ambassador of Israel to Ghana, Liberia and Sierra Leone since August 15, 2018.  For a short time, she was Chargé d'affaires in Turkey.,  She replaces Ami Mehl.  At the time of her appointment, Cooper was the only woman serving as an ambassador in Africa.

Biography
Before entering the foreign service, Cooper was an editor at Haaretz and an assistant professor for political science at Tel Aviv University and at the Open University.

Cooper earned a B.A. degree in political science and Journalism and an M.A. degree in Political Science (Magna Sum Laude), both from Tel Aviv University.

References

Israeli women ambassadors
Ambassadors of Israel to Liberia
Ambassadors of Israel to Ghana
Ambassadors of Israel to Sierra Leone
Ambassadors of Israel to Turkey
Academic staff of the Open University of Israel
Haaretz people
Israeli newspaper editors
Tel Aviv University alumni
Academic staff of Tel Aviv University
Year of birth missing (living people)
Living people